Pigritia faux is a moth in the family Blastobasidae. It is found in Costa Rica.

The length of the forewings is 3.5–4.9 mm. The forewings are pale greyish brown intermixed with few greyish-brown scales, with no distinct markings. The hindwings are translucent pale brown, gradually darkening towards the apex.

Etymology
The specific name is derived from Latin faux (meaning throat).

References

Moths described in 2013
Blastobasidae